Vildan Doğan (born September 5, 1984, in Istanbul, Turkey) is a Turkish karateka competing in the kumite -60 kg division. She is a member of the İstanbul Büyükşehir Belediyesi S.K.

Achievements
2010
  1st World Clubs Cup – November 20, Istanbul TUR – kumite team
  14th Balkan Children & Senior Karate Championships – September 24, Loutraki GRE – kumite -61 kg
  14th Balkan Children & Senior Karate Championships – September 24, Loutraki GRE – kumite team

2009
  16th Mediterranean Games – June 25-July 5, Pescara ITA – kumite -61 kg

2008
  19th World Championships – November 13, Tokyo JPN – kumite -60 kg

2007
  42nd European Championships – May 4, Bratislava SVK – kumite -60 kg

2005
  15th Mediterranean Games – June 25, Almeria ESP – kumite -50 kg
  40th European Championships – May 13, Tenerife ESP – kumite -60 kg
  Italian Open – April 8, Monza NED – kumite -53 kg

2004
  17th World Championships – November 18, Monterrey MEX – kumite team
  31st European Cadet & Junior Karate Championships – February 13 – kumite junior -53 kg

2003
  3rd World Junior & Cadet Karate Championships – October 24, Marseille FRA – kumite -53 kg

2002
  9th Balkan Senior Karate Championships – September 28 – kumite -60 kg
  9th Balkan Senior Karate Championships – September 28 – kumite team

References

1984 births
Sportspeople from Istanbul
Living people
Turkish female karateka
Turkish female martial artists
Istanbul Büyükşehir Belediyespor athletes
Mediterranean Games bronze medalists for Turkey
Competitors at the 2005 Mediterranean Games
Competitors at the 2009 Mediterranean Games
Mediterranean Games medalists in karate
21st-century Turkish women